Napoleon and Love is a 1974 British television series originally aired on ITV and lasting for 9 episodes from 5 March to 30 April 1974. The series stars Ian Holm in the title role as Napoleon and depicts his relationships with the women who featured in his life as a backdrop to his rise and fall.

Main cast
 Ian Holm as Napoleon
 Billie Whitelaw as Josephine Bonaparte
 Peter Bowles as Murat
 Ronald Hines as Berthier
 Peter Jeffrey as Talleyrand
 T. P. McKenna as Barras
 Sorcha Cusack as Hortense
 Edward de Souza as Joseph Bonaparte
 Wendy Allnutt as Madame Tallien
 Veronica Lang as Madame de Remusat
 John White as Constant
 Tim Curry as Eugene
 Karen Dotrice as Desiree
 Cheryl Kennedy as Pauline
 Nicola Pagett as Georgina
 Stephanie Beacham as Madame Duchatel
 Diana Quick as Eleonore
 Catherine Schell as Marie Walewska
 Susan Wooldridge as Marie-Louise
 Ian Trigger as Raguideau

Episodes

References

External links

1974 British television series debuts
1974 British television series endings
1970s British television miniseries
1970s British drama television series
ITV television dramas
Films about Napoleon
Cultural depictions of Charles Maurice de Talleyrand-Périgord
Cultural depictions of Joséphine de Beauharnais
English-language television shows
Period television series
Television series by Fremantle (company)
Television shows produced by Thames Television
Television shows shot at Teddington Studios